

Kalibak
Kalibak is a supervillain appearing in comic books published by DC Comics. He is the eldest son of Darkseid, half-brother of Orion and Grayven, and an enemy of Superman and the Justice League.

Created by Jack Kirby, being debuted with the rest of the New Gods, first appearing in New Gods #1 (February 1971) in an era called the Silver Age of comic books. He is originally and recurrently depicted as the brutish son of Darkseid commonly seeking his affection. He is also depicted as second in command as leader of Apokolips and rival to another of Darkseid' son, Orion. Kalibak's name is derived from the William Shakespeare character name Caliban, the half-man from The Tempest.

Kalibak is the first-born son of Darkseid and Suli. His mother Suli is killed by DeSaad, acting under orders from Kalibak's grandmother Queen Heggra. Kalibak becomes a legendary warrior, and often serves as Darkseid's second-in-command. After Darkseid breaks the pact of peace with New Genesis, the rival planet of Kalibak's home Apokolips, he aids his father in the resulting battles.

Kalibak is often pitted against Orion, and after numerous clashes they learned that they were half-brothers. This fuels Kalibak's hatred of Orion to new levels, for Darkseid clearly respects Orion over his first-born. Unlike Orion, Kalibak secretly craves the love and respect of his father – something neither he, nor anyone else, can ever hope to attain – and it has been shown that he has a gentle side which is completely submerged under his brutish exterior, and which he consistently and fearfully keeps hidden because on Apokolips, any sign of weakness is subject to the cruelest punishment.

For his part, Darkseid is more lenient towards Kalibak's failures than those of his other servants; having slain him, he always returns him to life. It is implied this is because his eldest son is the offspring of the one person Darkseid truly loved as well being one of the only few of his followers with genuine loyalty.

At one point, Kalibak is desperate enough to confront Orion without Darkseid's consent. Kalibak's scheme fell apart and he kills his accomplice DeSaad, also a servant of Darkseid, to cover his tracks. Darkseid was not pleased when he found out and reduced his son to a pile of ash. After enough time had passed Darkseid resurrected Kalibak, hoping the boy had learned a lesson.

Kalibak later spends some time in an Apokolips prison, on Darkseid's orders. In Orion #1, (June 2000), Darkseid is on Earth when Orion invades Apokolips. Justeen, a servant of DeSaad, releases Kalibak to battle Orion yet again. Kalibak is swiftly subdued, but does not care much as Orion leaves to battle Darkseid and Kalibak hopes to gain power as a result.

During the universe-wide Genesis incident, Apokolips forces, including Kalibak, invade Earth. In Young Heroes in Love #5, Kalibak and his small squad of Parademons are defeated by the leader of the Young Heroes, the telekinetic and telepathic Hard Drive.

Kalibak is slain by his uncle Infinity-Man, who has been murdering the residents of Apokolips and New Genesis as an agent of the Source Wall in Death of the New Gods.

In Final Crisis the new Fifth World and human version of Kalibak appears alongside Darkseid (calling himself Dark Side) seemingly reborn in a new form alongside his father and a human Kanto. This form is later replaced with a humanoid tiger-like form, engineered by Simyan and Mokkari. He is seen devouring a Green Lantern named Opto. He leads a regiment of tiger soldiers against the heroes in Blüdhaven, but he is killed in combat with Tawky Tawny. Before he dies, he begs his soldiers to help. They refuse as they only follow the strong. They then bow to Tawny as Kalibak dies.

In The New 52 (a 2011 reboot of the DC Comics universe), Kalibak is a loyal follower of Darkseid, backing him up in a war against the Anti-Monitor. He does have a problem with slaying Apokolips soldiers that literally get in the way between him and the enemy.

Kalibak possesses high levels of superhuman strength, endurance, and durability. Despite his muscular bulk, he is surprisingly fast and agile as well. Like all beings of the Fourth World he is immortal. Kalibak is a highly trained hand-to-hand combatant known on Apokolips for his savagery. He is armed with a Beta-Club, a weapon that fires force bolts or nerve beams that causes living beings agonizing pain beyond comprehension. It is nearly indestructable, though Orion once destroyed it with some assistance from Lightray. He can also summon and use aero-disks which allow him to fly. Kalibak also has access to high-tech weapons of mass destruction. Physically, Kalibak is one of the strongest gods on Apokolips, and the most loyal to Darkseid. This is what makes Kalibak an indispensable member of Darkseid's Elite. Kalibak possesses incredible levels of superhuman strength almost on par with Superman, Orion, and even Darkseid himself. Once he had been augmented by his father in an effort to secure the Life-Equation from an elemental wielder; Darkseid had bestowed his son with vastly augmented might and menace enabling him to physically overpower his once far stronger brother Orion in combat, even granting him the ability of psi-beams which are an Omega effect like psionic blast which spike individual minds with blinding amounts of mental agony.

Alternate versions of Kalibak
In the tie-in comics to Injustice: Gods Among Us, Kalibak travels to Earth after Superman calls a peace treaty where he attacks him. After vanquishing the Parademon with Kalibak, Superman engages Kalibak in battle. When Kalibak states that he is a god, Superman states that he does not care and kills Kalibak. Darkseid is not pleased at the death of his son, which causes him to seek revenge in Injustice 2.

Kalibak in other media
 Kalibak appears in Super Friends, voiced by Frank Welker. This version is not as brutish as later incarnations, and more resembles the original Jack Kirby design for the character. He was almost always depicted as boastful, dull-witted and ineffectual against the heroes.
 Kalibak made multiple appearances in the DCAU, voiced by Michael Dorn.
 Kalibak was featured on Superman: The Animated Series. Like in the comics, he seeks to earn his father's approval. He appears in "Father's Day" where he, DeSaad, and Bruno Mannheim watch Superman fight one of DeSaad's robots. He even pleaded to his father to fight Superman, but Darkseid denied that with Kalibak immediately complying. Kalibak was manipulated by DeSaad to go to Earth so that he can fight Superman so could prove himself, despite his initial reluctance and distrust in DeSaad's suggestion. Kalibak and Superman fight it out in Metropolis – on Father's day. Darkseid later finds out about this even when he forced the answers out of DeSaad. Superman managed to send Kalibak flying into the nearby park. By the time Superman caught up with Kalibak, Darkseid arrived and withdrew Kalibak back to Apokolips with the Omega Effect. In the "Apokolips...Now" two-parter, he takes part in Darkseid's invasion of Earth. In "Legacy", he fights Superman again when he breaks free from Darkseid's brainwashing.
 In Justice League, Kalibak appears in "Twilight" leading the attack against Brainiac. Though Kalibak's forces are unable to penetrate Brainiac's force field, they are able to advance after Superman destroys the force field. He later returned in "Hereafter" as a member of the Superman Revenge Squad in a plot to kill Superman. His brute strength allows him to defeat Wonder Woman, but he is then thwarted by Batman until Superman arrives, who knocks him out in one punch. During a second attack, he ended up engaging Lobo in battle and lost when Lobo buried him beneath an enormous pile of cars.
 In Justice League Unlimited, Darkseid's death created a power struggle on Apokolips, with Kalibak as Darkseid's son, whoever could bend him to their will could claim control of the planet. Granny Goodness appeared before Mister Miracle and Big Barda to free Kalibak from the X-Pits so  Granny Goodness could release Oberon from her clutches. With the help of the Flash, they freed Kalibak, only to trick Granny Goodness with Martian Manhunter, who had transformed into Kalibak. Flash was able to free Oberon in time, Granny Goodness was defeated, and Kalibak was returned to a prison on Earth, in an attempt to prolong the power struggle on Apokolips.
 Kalibak appears in the Batman: The Brave and the Bold episode "The Knights of Tomorrow!" voiced by Michael-Leon Wooley. He along with the parademons hunt down Question after he discovers Darkseid's plans to invade Earth. In "Darkseid Descending!", he invades Earth to prepare for his father's arrival.
 Kalibak appears in the Justice League Action episode "Superman's Pal, Sid Sharp," voiced by Piotr Michael. This version speaks in a caveman-like manner, and is even more dull-witted than his comics version.
 Kalibak appears in Young Justice: Outsiders, voiced by Dee Bradley Baker.

Film
 An alternate universe version of Kalibak makes a non-speaking cameo in Justice League: Gods and Monsters.

Games
 Kalibak appears as a boss at the New Genesis level in DC Universe Online.
 Kalibak is referenced in Injustice 2. Like the tie-in comics, it was mentioned in Darkseid's ending that Superman killed Kalibak. Darkseid managed to avenge Kalibak by killing Superman. Though before killing him, Darkseid revealed that he planned to have DeSaad break Supergirl, turning her into Darkseid's servant and create an army of Parademons created using Superman's DNA in a perversion of the phrase "Blood for Blood".

Lego
 Kalibak appears as a playable character in Lego Batman 3: Beyond Gotham, voiced by Travis Willingham.
 Kalibak appears in Lego DC Super-Villains, voiced again by Michael Dorn.

Adeline Kane
Adeline Kane, formerly Adeline Wilson, is best known as both the leader of the criminal organization the H.I.V.E. and the ex-wife of Slade Wilson, a.k.a. Deathstroke the Terminator. An enemy of the Teen Titans, Adeline first appeared in New Teen Titans #34 (August 1983). She was brought up as a wealthy jet-setting playgirl, despite being trained by a father who had worked with Chinese guerrilla forces. But after a traumatic first marriage at 19, she joined the U.S. military, where she met, trained, and married Slade Wilson. After Slade left the military, Slade and Adeline took up the socialite lifestyle Adeline had been raised into. 

Unbeknownst to her, Slade was using his hunting trips to gain clients for his mercenary side job, which resulted in the kidnapping and near-death of their younger son, Joseph. Enraged and betrayed by Slade's prioritization of his honor code over their son's well-being, Adeline shot her husband and, when he survived, served him with divorce papers.

Grant, who had idolized his father, rebelled against his mother and ran away to New York, where he ran into the Titans and ended up dying due to his alliance with the H.I.V.E. Slade vowed to pick up his dead son's contract against the Teen Titans; Adeline promptly interfered; she blamed Slade for Grant's death. Due to Adeline's intervention, Joseph, who had been working with her, joined the Titans as Jericho.

Joseph eventually became possessed by the spirits of Azarath. Begging his father to kill him to prevent the corrupted spirits from achieving their purpose, Adeline's only remaining son died at her husband's hand. Adeline found this out from one of her Searchers Inc. agents, rather than from Slade himself, which merely cemented her long-held grudge against her ex-husband.

Slade, however, held no grudge against her, keeping an eye out for her safety and attempting to aid her when he thought he could get away with it; e.g., when Adeline had been abducted by her first husband Morel, a.k.a. Count Tavolera, who had poisoned her in an attempt to force her to work with him to discover her ancestor Josiah Kane's treasure.

To save Adeline's life, Slade gave her some of his own serum-altered blood. This ended up driving her crazy; Slade's genotype had a unique mutation which enabled him to effectively metabolize his serum. Other less fortunate people either died or went insane.

For a time, Adeline went underground, slowly losing more and more of her normal cognitive abilities, though none of her tactical skills. She eventually turned herself into the H.I.V.E. Mistress, in her madness focusing on superheroes as the reason for her sons' death and creating a plan to kill all the superheroes that she could.

Her plot ultimately resulted in her death. Vandal Savage put a team together to take advantage of Adeline's plan, intending to take her immortal blood to create a sort of Fountain of Youth potion. With her throat cut, unable to die and yet unable to fully heal, Adeline regained her sanity briefly and pleaded with Slade (who had learned of her involvement and arrived to try and save her) to kill her and reunite her with their children. However, because he still had feelings for her no matter what she had done, he was unable to comply with her request, so Starfire killed her instead.

New 52/Rebirth
In the New 52, Adeline was revived, and in this continuity, Adeline was a US Army squadron leader and drill instructor for Team 7. She married one of these soldiers, Slade Wilson, after he had a near death experience. Shortly after that, she gave birth to Grant Wilson and Joseph Wilson.

Adeline Kane in other media
 Adeline Kane appears in Titans, portrayed by Mayko Nguyen.
 Adeline Kane appears in Deathstroke: Knights & Dragons, voiced by Sasha Alexander.

Jacob Kane
Jacob Kane is a fictional character appearing American comic books published by DC Comics.

Jacob Kane and his wife Gabrielle Kane were both soldiers in the U.S. Army (he a member of the 3rd Special Forces Group and she part of the 525th Battlefield Surveillance Brigade), and are the parents of Kate Kane and Beth Kane. The Kanes are Jewish and Jacob Kane inherited vast wealth along with his other siblings. Bette Kane (the superheroine known as Flamebird, and later Hawkfire) is his niece and Bruce Wayne is his nephew, since Martha Wayne was Jacob's sister.

Jacob Kane is promoted to colonel and assigned to NATO headquarters in Brussels, Belgium. When the twins turned 12 years old, their mother took them to a restaurant for a birthday dessert, despite Jacob being away due to a security crisis. A terrorist group (later revealed to be the organization known as the "Many Arms of Death") kidnapped the family during their trip, and Col. Kane led a rescue mission to save them. During the raid, Gabrielle was murdered by the terrorists. The terrorists kidnapped another young girl and murdered her too. Kate, seeing the body of a young girl under a blanket, is left with the impression her sister died. Col. Kane, however, knew that the terrorists had Beth. Despite looking for years, Col. Kane never found Beth. He never told Kate that Beth might still be alive. Col. Kane remarries years later to Hamilton Rifle Company heiress Catherine Hamilton, who becomes Kate's stepmother.

Jacob's emotional steadiness proved to be a major source of stability for Kate in the aftermath of the tragedy, and she sought to emulate that for herself and follow him into Army service, which Jacob supported. Thanks to his higher rank, Jacob was able to be more present in Kate's life during this time. He taught Kate how to box when she was a teenager, accompanied her to R-Day at West Point when she was an incoming freshman, and is implied to have given Kate ringside coaching during an academy championship boxing match that helped her win the fight. Kate's resignation from the academy due to DADT allegations took Jacob by surprise, but he immediately accepted her when she came out to him.

After Kate became a vigilante, Jacob aided her campaign against crime by organizing her training, designing her Batwoman suit and gear, developing her operational headquarters, and maintaining radio contact with her during patrols to provide information and advice.

The Alice persona kidnaps Col. Kane, who immediately recognizes as his now-grown daughter Beth, and uses him to gain access to a military base near Gotham City. She seizes chemical weapons from the base and intends to kill everyone in the city by dispersing them from an aircraft. Alice falls into Gotham Bay during her final battle with Batwoman after revealing her identity, and is again presumed dead.

In 2011, DC Comics rebooted the DC universe through "The New 52." Jacob's history of losing his wife and what happened to Beth remains intact, as well as his support for Kate's campaign as Batwoman. In addition, the New 52 establishes that an informal group of Jacob's closest friends within the special operations community, known as the Murder of Crows, were the ones Jacob assembled to conduct Kate's Batwoman training.

Jacob has been depicted as a highly decorated soldier, appearing with the following awards: the Army Achievement Medal, the Kosovo Campaign Medal, the Afghanistan Campaign Medal, the Iraq Campaign Medal, the Global War on Terrorism Expeditionary Medal, the Global War on Terrorism Service Medal, the NATO Medal for Kosovo, the Kuwait Liberation Medal, the Presidential Unit Citation, the Meritorious Unit Commendation, the Army Aviator Badge, the Air Assault Badge, and the Combat Infantryman Badge.

Jacob Kane in other media
 Jacob Kane appears in Batwoman, portrayed by Dougray Scott. This version is the founder of the Crows security firm and married Catherine Hamilton-Kane following the death of his first wife.
 Jacob Kane appears in Batman: Bad Blood, voiced by Geoff Pierson.
 Jacob Kane appears in Gotham Knights, voiced by Tommie Earl Jenkins. This version is the head of Kane Industries and leader of the Court of Owls who is aware of Batman and his proteges' identities. After learning of his connection to the Court, the Gotham Knights apprehend Jacob, but Talia al Ghul kills him before he can be handed over to the police.

Karen Keeny
Karen Kenny is a character who appears in Year One: Batman/Scarecrow (July 2005), the mother of Jonathan Crane.

Karen is the youngest daughter in a long line of Georgia gentry from Arlen. She was raised by her strict mother and grandmother, which led to her having a rebellious youth. Karen meets Gerald Crane, going into a short relationship and later becoming pregnant. She wasn't allowed to raise her child – even the naming was done by her grandmother.

Karen moved to Latham, marrying a man named Charlie Jarvis, who was abusive and jealous, wanting above all the deed to the family mansion, which she didn't have. When her son came back to kill his last remaining relatives, Charlie became more jealous, as she received strange letters under her maiden name. When Scarecrow comes to her house, he kills Jarvis and was going to kill Karen and her infant daughter when Batman arrives and stops him.

Knowing all the people he had killed, Karen felt guilty for Jonathan's deeds and contemplated suicide, but talked out of it by Deadman.

The character appears in Gotham, portrayed by Dorothea Harahan. Renamed Karen Crane, she is the wife of Gerald Crane and the mother of Jonathan Crane. She died in a fire one year ago while Gerald was paralyzed with fear and unable to rescue her. Her death was a direct cause of Gerald's obsession with "curing" himself and his son of fear. She appears as hallucination in "The Scarecrow" as a woman in flame as Gerald tries to conquer his greatest fear.

Katana

Barbara Kean

Kelex

Kid Eternity

Kid Flash

Kilg%re
Kilg%re was an electro-mechano-organic intelligence that needed electro-life to survive. It consumed its entire home planet in the Pleides sector and then moved on into space. It was attacked by something known as Meta#sker and placed into a vibrational limbo. Somehow, it found its way to the flats near Salt Lake City on Earth. It could only be seen by people traveling at high speeds, such as an F-15 pilot or the Flash. The Flash unknowingly released it from the limbo it was imprisoned in and it followed him to S.T.A.R. Labs and took over its electrical systems. Kilg%re found the number of machines on Earth ideal for its survival, but humans it deemed distractions and planned to destroy them. It delivered an ultimatum: abandon North America by 12:00 noon on May 10 or be destroyed. During a battle with the Flash in Salt Lake City, it turned out all the power in the country. The Flash sought the help of Cyborg, who used the Titans' satellite to relay the message to the governments of the world to shut down all power to kill Kilg%re. This scared it out of the power grid and it weaved a giant mechanical snake across the Utah flats, trying to complete a circuit by catching up with the cloned body of S.T.A.R. Labs' Dr. Schmitz to survive. However, the Flash outraced it, supposedly killing it. After Kilg%re's defeat at the hands of the Flash he appeared to be destroyed, but resurfaced in the form of a sentient computer mind hidden in a self-created computer operating system in a deep cave. When Maxwell Lord was spelunking one day, his then-president had fallen deep into the cave where Kilg%re lay dormant. Sensing a human life, Kilg%re decided to help coax Max into further succeeding his own plans, as well as Max's subconscious plans of self-actualization. To do this, Kilg%re decided to help Max start the new Justice League and grow the group into becoming more international. Kilg%re served in a behind-the-scenes role, constantly coaxing and manipulating Max into furthering his plans, such as gaining money, power and cutting-edge technology to give Kilg%re a stronger machine to inhabit. Through such advantages, Kilg%re and Max were able to create a better duplicate of the Justice League signal device, begin a recruitment drive and find willing villains, gaining additional muscle such as Booster Gold and a new Ace android. Kilg%re grew impatient and decided to start using bigger ideas, such as inciting an international incident to distract Justice League International. To do this, he found hidden technologies designed as a monitoring device by Metron. He launched the satellite, which was only defeated by Mister Miracle because he was used to New God technology. A serious mishap occurred during the Millennium event, in which the Manhunters took over the bodies of those they deemed were close enough to major figures to do damage. One of these Manhunters took over the body of the secretary of Max and, when she delivered coffee to him, she shot him four times. Rushing to Max's safety, Kilg%re promptly eliminated the threat by combining some of his technology with Max to save his life and kill the Manhunter. Max eventually learned of Kilg%re's tampering when half of Kilg%re was destroyed by the construct falling through the building that housed Kilg%re. In Kilg%re's fleeting moments, he threw another series of visions designed to tamper with Max's thoughts and implant Kilg%re into another larger system. Max refused and destroyed what was left of Kilg%re's last computing body. Doing so removed the cyborg self-repairing systems in Max's body, which landed him in the hospital. Kilg%re, however, was not completely destroyed.

Kilg%re appeared in DC Rebirths Cyborg #1, 2 and 18 and The Flash/Speed Buggy Special #1.

Powers and abilities of Kilg%re
Kilg%re, being a machine, is able to communicate with and disrupt other machines. It is additionally able to move at superhuman speeds and generate electricity.

Kilg%re in other media
 A human variation of Kilg%re appears in the fourth season of The Flash, portrayed by Dominic Burgess. This version is a human computer programmer named Ramsey Deacon, who developed an application that his teammates stole for self-profit, leaving him with nothing. Following this, the Thinker tricks the Flash into exposing Deacon to dark matter, turning him into a technopathic metahuman. Introduced in the episode "Mixed Signals", Ramsey takes the name "Kilg%re" and uses his powers to take revenge on his former teammates, killing one and nearly doing the same to the others until he is stopped by Team Flash and remanded to Iron Heights Penitentiary. In the episode "True Colors", Kilg%re, Dwarfstar, Hazard, and Black Bison mount an escape before Warden Gregory Wolfe can sell them to Amunet Black, but the Thinker kills them for their powers.
 Kilg%re appears in issue #28 of the Justice League Adventures tie-in comic.
 Kilg%re appears in issue #14 of the Green Lantern: The Animated Series tie-in comic.

King Standish

Killer Croc

Killer Frost

Killer Moth

Thaddeus Killgrave
Thaddeus Killgrave is a villain in DC Comics.

Thaddeus Killgrave is a mad scientist with dwarfism who would either create technology to fight Superman or sell them to other criminals. He was a frequent collaborator of Intergang in their fight against Superman.

Thaddeus Killgrave in other media
Killgrave features in the Lois & Clark: The New Adventures of Superman novel Exile, where he is able to infect Superman with a highly contagious alien virus. While the virus cannot kill Superman, it transforms the Man of Steel into a Patient Zero for the disease, forcing him into isolation at S.T.A.R. Labs to try and find a cure while Killgrave's associates mount a crime spree (Superman is able to continue fighting by operating in a containment suit, but this restricts his powers as he cannot allow the suit to be torn or he will risk infecting the world). Killgrave ultimately intends to release the virus on a large scale so that he can be the last human being alive, dismissive of humanity as a whole in favour of his own ego, but Lois Lane is able to find Killgrave's lab and samples of his antidote by tracking the alien pathogen used to create the virus. Killgrave is caught when he attempts to release the virus at a museum display on weaponry as Superman recalls his fascination with weapons of mass destruction; he manages to tear Superman's containment suit, but Superman seals the suit and hides in a submarine on display until Lois arrives with the antidote.

Thaddeus Killgrave appears in the Superman & Lois episode "Haywire", portrayed by Brendan Fletcher. Intergang springs him from a prison transport from Metropolis Penitentiary and assist in his revenge on Superman. One Intergang operative is used as bait for Superman so that Killgrave can use a sonic weapon on him. Superman knocks out Killgrave with a powerful clap attack and then calls Sam Lane to have his men pick up the defeated bad guys and to have the medics tend to the bystanders.

King Cobra
There have been at least two different characters named King Cobra in American comic books published by DC Comics.

Batman villain
The King Cobra is a mob boss in Gotham City who wears a green snake costume. He is the leader of a criminal group called the Cobra Gang. He makes his first appearance in Batman #139 (April 1961).

Shadow villain
This version of the King Cobra is a New York City gangster and an enemy to Kent Allard.

Other versions of King Cobra
 The Batman Beyond version of the King Cobra appears in the Batman Beyond comic book series.
 The King Cobra appears in the final issue of the comic book series Batman '66, set in the universe of the 1966 Batman TV series.

King Cobra in other media
 The Batman version of the King Cobra appears in the animated main title sequence of the 1966 Batman TV series. This makes the King Cobra the first Batman villain from the comics to appear in animated form.
 A variation of the King Cobra appears in the Batman Beyond episode "Splicers", voiced by Tim Dang. This version is a teenager transformed into a snake hybrid by Dr. Abel Cuvier, who fights Terry McGinnis before being defeated, given an antidote, and returned to normal.
 The Batman version of the King Cobra appears in the Batman: The Brave and the Bold episodes "A Bat Divided!" and "The Vile and the Villainous!".
 The Batman version of the King Cobra appears in Scooby-Doo! & Batman: The Brave and the Bold.

Willoughby Kipling
Willoughby Kipling is a fictional character in the DC Comics universe. He first appeared in Doom Patrol (vol. 2) #31 and was created by Grant Morrison and Richard Case.

Kipling appears mostly in the Doom Patrol comic series. The character was originally intended to be John Constantine, but at the time DC Comics editorial policy limited Constantine's use outside of his own series to preserve the realism of the character. Kipling was created as a substitute, and was based upon Richard E. Grant's title character from the British cult film Withnail and I. He appeared intermittently,  helping the team against various threats, such as the Cult of the Unwritten Book and the Candlemaker. He is a member of the mystic Knights Templar, a coward who practices a bizarre form of black magic and is a self-proclaimed expert on the occult.

Later, Kipling's voice-over appears in JLA Classified #15 (February 2006). He and several other magic-users use their knowledge to assist Oracle and the Justice League of America defeat a mystic threat.

Willougby Kipling in other media
 Willoughby Kipling appears in the DC Universe series Doom Patrol, portrayed by Mark Sheppard as an adult and by Tyler Crumley as a child. His history of being a member of the Knights Templar remains intact. The character first appears in the episode "Cult Patrol" in which he comes looking for the Chief. The Chief is missing, so Kipling enlists the Doom Patrol to help him prevent the end of the world. They fail and the Cult of the Unwritten Book summons the Decreator, an interdimensional entity who begins destroying the world. In "Paw Patrol", the Chief works with his nemesis Mr. Nobody to use one of Crazy Jane's superpowered personalities to initiate the creation of the Recreator, a being who can counter the Decreator. Kipling uses this being (which is embodied by a dog) to summon the Recreator and nullify the threat. In the episode "Fun Size Patrol", Elasti-Girl persuades the Chief to enlist Willoughby Kipling to help restore everyone to their respectful sizes. Kipling does that in exchange for the Chief giving him a talisman that grants its wielder immortality. The Chief later spoke to Kipling about other ways to prolong his life. In the mid-credits scene of "Possibilities Patrol" taking place in the Northern Yukon, Kipling takes the head of the deceased Chief stating that his time isn't over yet. In "Undead Patrol", Darren Jones steals the Chief's head causing Kipling to enlist the Doom Patrol for help. During season four, Kipling works to get the Doom Patrol to be ready for the coming of Immortus.

Kirigi
Takibi Kirigi is a martial arts master in DC Comics. The character, created by James Owsley and Jim Aparo, first appeared in Batman #431 (March 1989). He taught Bruce Wayne the art of ninjitsu when Bruce approached him for martial arts training. He was later hired by Ra's al Ghul to train members of the League of Assassins in ninjutsu such as the Bronze Tiger, Bruce and Kyodai Ken. Batman visited Kirigi when he recognized some of the moves done by the League of Assassins members that Kirigi taught him.

Kirigi in other media
 Kirigi appears in the video game Batman: Arkham Origins, voiced by Kaiji Tang. He is featured in the "Initiation" DLC challenge map. Before he becomes Batman, Bruce Wayne approaches his dojo in the mountains of North Korea and asks Kirigi to train him. Kirigi lets him train with him and his students for a while out of pity and later tests him to see if he is worthy. Depending on how the player operates Bruce Wayne during this performance, there are three different endings after Bruce Wayne defeats Lady Shiva. If the player completes the challenge map with less than nine medals, Kirigi states that Bruce is the best foreigner that he has trained, yet he does not say much. Kirigi then sends Bruce to find a bucket and broom to clean the latrines. If the player completes the challenge map with nine or more medals, Kirigi is impressed with Bruce's progress, yet states that he still has a lot to learn. For the time being, Kirigi then sends Bruce to find a rag to clean the floors. If the player completes the challenge map with all 15 medals, Kirigi states to Bruce that he is impressed and, at the same time, also states that he is rarely impressed. Upon telling Bruce that he has gained his dojo's respect and proven himself worthy, Kirigi states that he will be given the information that he seeks. Bruce is sent to the kitchen by Kirigi to prepare tea for him and all of Kirigi's students, where there is much to discuss.

Klarion the Witch Boy

Kobra

Kole

Komodo

Komodo (Simon Lacroix) first appears in Green Arrow (vol. 5) #17 (April 2013). He was created by writer Jeff Lemire and artist Andrea Sorrentino. Komodo was once Robert Queen's protégé and was part of Robert's expedition to find the "Arrow Totem", which was said to bring enlightenment. Seeking this enlightenment for himself, Lacroix betrayed and murdered Robert, but could not find the Totem. Consumed by his desire for the Totem's enlightenment, Lacroix strove to destroy Oliver Queen and the Green Arrow and became the masked archer "Komodo". Through his company Stellmoor International, he works on behalf of the Outsiders, a shadowy secret society of warriors from different weapon disciplines, which he wants to rule. Komodo travels with his equally deadly "daughter" Emiko, who, in fact, is the daughter of Robert Queen and the archer Shado. Emiko later learns this and is shocked, and learning that both her parents were alive, turned against Komodo. He attempted to kill her but, ultimately, she killed him with an arrow shot through his heart.

Komodo in other media
 Two versions of the character appear in the live-action series Arrow. 
 Komodo also appears in the third season episode "Sara", portrayed by Matt Ward. This version is a mercenary from Sainte-Sophie, Quebec, who begins targeting several businessmen in Star City, but is prevented by Team Arrow for Ray Palmer. Arrow and the others think that he killed Sara Lance, but he denies it which is proven to be correct. Komodo then escapes from them and is never seen again.
 A character with similar motivations, Simon Morrison, appears as a series regular in the fifth season, portrayed by Josh Segarra. This version poses as the Earth-1 version of Adrian Chase and Prometheus while being a nemesis of Green Arrow. After his father Justin Claybourne's death, he vowed revenge and conducted research into Claybourne's murderer, eventually learning it is Oliver Queen. After seeking out Talia al Ghul to train him in the League of Assassins' ways, Morrison targets and haunts Queen and the latter's allies, manipulates Artemis, and recruits Black Siren to his cause. While Team Arrow eventually deduce Morrison's identities, the latter kidnaps William Clayton and captures Queen's teammates to lure Queen to the island Lian Yu. In their ensuing fight, Morrison reveals he has rigged the island with explosives and that the trigger is in his brain before killing himself, though Queen and most of the captives survive.

Jarvis Kord
Jarvis Kord is the scientist uncle of Ted Kord. Created by D.C. Glanzman and Steve Ditko, he first appeared in Secret Origins (vol. 2) #2 (May 1986).

He was working to create an army of androids to take over Earth, resulting in his nephew and Dan Garrett investigating and foiling his ambitions, but Jarvis killed the original Blue Beetle and himself during their battle which inspired the second Blue Beetle.

Jarvis Kord in other media
Jarvis Kord appears in the Batman: The Brave and the Bold episode "Fall of the Blue Beetle!", voiced by Tim Matheson. After his nephew Ted came to him for help in activating the Blue Beetle scarab, Jarvis sought to use the device to create an army of robots to take over Hub City. However, he was foiled by Ted and Batman, with the former sacrificing himself to keep the scarab out of Jarvis' possession. In the present, Jarvis manipulates Jaime Reyes into believing he is Ted in another attempt to obtain the scarab, only to foiled by Reyes and Batman.

Kristen Kramer
Kristen Kramer is a character appearing in American comic books published by DC Comics. She was an intern at the Central City Police Departmant and colleague of Flash.

In 2016, DC Comics implemented another relaunch of its books called "DC Rebirth", which restored its continuity to a form much as it was prior to "The New 52". In her early life, Kristen's parents were killed in a car accident and her sister Kim later committed suicide. Years later, Kristen became a full crime scene investigator at the time when a lightning storm endowed some of its inhabitants with superpowers.

Kristen Kramer in other media
Kristen Kramer appears in The Flash, portrayed by Carmen Moore. This version is a woman of Wet'suwet'en descent who is a liaison for Governor's Municipal Logistics Commission. After Iris West did a background check on her, Kristen admits to Joe West that she is hunting Killer Frost. Her other background is that the platoon she was part of was led into an ambush by an unidentified metahuman that they trusted which led to her issues with metahumans that claim that they can do good. When Killer Frost was apprehended and put on trial, Kramer used Councillor Strong to push Judge Tanaka's decision to use the meta-cure on Killer Frost. This is thwarted when Killer Frost opted to serve a life sentence to atone for her past misdeeds. Kramer later returned where she was investigating the disappearance of Rainbow Raider. She was also having the metahuman cure bullets be made causing Joe to resign from the CCPD. Joe later found information thanks to a military contact that Kristen actually lead her unit into an ambush as Joe claims to Cecile that she was working with the enemy that wiped out her platoon. Kramer did not lead her men into the ambush deliberately – her brother (not by blood) Adam Creyke did. He just warned her to stay away and she didn't realize what was about to happen. She has blamed herself ever since and is now asking Joe to help her track Adam down. While staking out Creyke's boat, Joe and Kristen are ambushed. They managed to turn the tide on Creyke and take him prisoner. After informing the FBI everything about him, Kramer and Joe started to return to Central City where they witnessed its civilians leaving town and two Godspeed Drones fighting each other. It turns out that she is a metahuman who can copy the ability of any meta in close proximity for a short period of time. Thus she survived the explosion that took out the rest of her unit by copying Adam's invulnerability and later gains superspeed to save Joe from a Godspeed clone. Realizing what her actions have caused, she decides to take a leave of absence and sort of get her head straight. In season eight, Kramer has disbanded the Metahuman Task Force. She is still trying to get control of her abilities like when she unintentionally copied a barista's heat abilities which warmed her ice coffee. Following the fight against Goldface where she briefly copied his abilities, Kramer deduced that Flash was Barry and he agreed to help her control her copying abilities.

Kritter
Kritter is a fictional character appearing in American comic books published by DC Comics.

Doctor Love experimented on some unborn children of women. One of these children became a large humanoid dog with super-strength, enhanced sense of smell, and genius-level intellect that took the name of Kritter. He became part of Helix and fought Infinity, Inc. on occasion. As Kritter can't speak English, he has to wear a special translating collar to interpret his dog language.

Kritter in other media
Kritter appears in the Stargirl episode "Frenemies – Chapter Eight: Infinity Inc. Part Two". This version is a normal dog and companion of Tao Jones where they both reside at the Helix Institute for Youth Rehabilitation.

Kryptonite Man
The Kryptonite Man is the name of several supervillains appearing in stories published by DC Comics.

Krytonite Man I
The original Kryptonite Man started out as a teen-age alien criminal called the Kryptonite Kid. On the planet Blor, he faced a 20 year sentence, he volunteered for a scientific experiment, a satellite that required a test passenger. He favored dying in deep space to rotting in jail, with the added bonus of a 10,000 to 1 chance of surviving the test. 

He was loaded in the satellite together with a laboratory dog, and the satellite was shot into deep space, never to return. To pass the time, they watched a telescopic viewer of Earth and learned of Superboy's existence. On their course for Earth, they passed through a green cloud of gaseous Kryptonite, which gave him and his dog Kryptonite-based powers. This incarnation is most well-known Pre-Crisis on Infinite Earths from his appearance and death in the non-continuity story Superman: Whatever Happened to the Man of Tomorrow?. In this story, he is depicted as somewhat older and uses the name the Kryptonite Man.

Alien version
A second Kryptonite Man appeared in Superman #397.  He had been the ruler of a race of humanoids who inhabited Krypton (called "Ny'L'Uyl" in his language) eons before Superman's ancestors. When a nearby cosmic body threatens life on Krypton, the second Kryptonite Man, whose real name is never given, sends all of his people into stasis deep underground, while he himself remains on the highest mountain peak, to act as guardian. He is then placed in suspended animation for what is to be 20 years, at which time, he will awaken to determine if the planet is habitable once again. For some reason, the machinery fails, and the unnamed ruler slept for over 1,000 years. Unfortunately, the very day he awoke is the day Krypton exploded. The mountain that the unnamed ruler's observatory was on is sent into space. Somehow, the king is able to feed off of the Kryptonite radiation the mountain produced. He eventually became dependent upon these energies to sustain his life at all times, weakening outside of its influence. This second Kryptonite Man blames the pink-skinned humanoid inhabitants (Superman's race) with the death of Krypton, never realizing it was a natural disaster. Eventually, after the Kryptonite radiation of the mountain began to fade, the Kryptonite Man encounters a race known as the Seeders. For unknown reasons, the ships of this race produce radiation similar enough to Kryptonite radiation, that Kryptonite Man could feed off of, and survive. Kryptonite Man discovers the existence of Kryptonians on Earth, and stealing a Seeder ship, travels there to confront and kill them. Kryptonite Man attacks Superman, but their battle was interrupted by the Seeders, who took offense to Kryptonite Man's theft. The story continued in Supergirl (vol. 2) #21, where Supergirl joined Superman in fighting Kryptonite Man and the Seeders.

Superman clone
In the Post-Crisis era, the Kryptonite Man appears in Superman (vol. 2) #43 as a green-skinned clone of Superman, grown by the scientific spies Simyan and Mokkari.

Captain Atom creation
A character in the ongoing series Superman/Batman also uses the name Kryptonite Man.  This version of the character is created when Captain Atom absorbed the explosive energy from Major Force, then went out to destroy a Kryptonite meteor. The Kryptonite energy somehow combined with the remaining energy from Major Force in Captain Atom to create a sentient energy force. After being siphoned from Captain Atom by the Toyman, the energy was able to jump from body to body, taking over the personality and causing the body to release Kryptonite radiation.

K. Russell Abernathy
After DC Comics' One Year Later jump, a scientist named K. Russell Abernathy was working on an experiment to use Kryptonite to develop a new energy source using isotopes. The experiment explodes, infusing Abernathy's body with radiation. Clark Kent, powerless, summons the current Supergirl to contain him. The transformed Abernathy, in a misguided attempt to prove his energy theories, goes on a violent rampage; this includes deliberately attempting to injure Kryptonians. He is soon subdued and imprisoned in Stryker's.

Lex Luthor sends insectile warriors who free Abernathy from the prison. Abernathy is used in conjunction with large amounts of Kryptonite to free an ancient Kryptonian spaceship outta Sunstone. He later resurfaced in Action Comics #853, having Superman beaten until the timely intervention of Jimmy Olsen and Krypto.

Clay Ramsay
In September 2011, The New 52 rebooted DC's continuity. In this new timeline, Kryptonite Man is reintroduced in Action Comics #5, by Grant Morrison and Andy Kubert. His origin is told in Action Comics Annual #1 (2012) (penned by Sholly Fisch). 

In this origin, Clay Ramsay was an abusive husband living in Metropolis. One night, Superman broke into his house while he was beating his wife and threw him into Hob's Bay. His wife subsequently left him and no one in the justice system could help him. Seeking revenge, he joined the mysterious "Project K-Man" (a private super-soldier project) after receiving an invitation from Dr. Abernathy (a nod to the pre-New 52 version of the character). Gaining superhuman powers, he attacked Superman but was defeated and arrested. He was released shortly afterwards by General Sam Lane who believed he was needed as a countermeasure to keep Superman in check. K-Man agreed under the condition that the General would help him locate his wife. It was revealed that Lex Luthor had played a major role in the K-Man's creation. Also (as revealed in flashback), he had stolen Kryptonite crystals from the government while being employed by them.

His subsequent activities are unknown, but a version of him from the near future was a member of the Anti-Superman Army. He was seen alongside two people with similar powers (one equipped with Red another with Blue) as part of a group called the "K-Men".

Alternate versions of Kryptonite Man
In the Elseworlds storyline Superman: The Last Family of Krypton, when Jor-El and Lara accompany Kal-El to Earth, they have two more children, Bru-El and Valora, whose genetic potential is slightly 'stunted' compared to their brother due to them being born on Earth.  As part of his vendetta against the El family, Lex Luthor is able to turn Bru-El against his family, using a series of nanites designed to make him immune to kryptonite to make him essentially addicted to it, transforming him into a kryptonite-powered superhuman with too little willpower to defy Luthor's orders. He subsequently kills his mother in the attack on the El compound, but Kal-El is able to defeat his brother when he expends too much of his energy. With Luthor's plot defeated, Bru-El is purged of the nanites, at the cost of losing his memory; with Lara's last words being that Bru-El never learn of his role in his mother's death, he is last recorded as having reached an eighth-grade level following his mindwipe.

Kryptonite Man in other media
 The Kryptonite Kid appears in the Superboy episode "Kryptonite Kid", played by Jay Underwood. A young man named Mike Walker, working at a military research base, was caught in a Kryptonite explosion while trying to find a way to make Superboy immune to Kryptonite radiation. The Kryptonite entered his bloodstream, as well as his nervous system, turning his skin green and affecting his mind in vicious ways. Walker became "living, breathing Kryptonite," able to fire Kryptonite radiation from his hands. Superboy was able to defeat him through enlisting the aid of a human man who had been arrested for fraud in taking advantage of his resemblance to Superboy to make money and attract girls. In exchange for getting the charges dropped, Superboy convinced the man to stand up to Walker, whereby Walker's Kryptonite beams had no effect on him. With Mike Walker distracted as to why he was not harming the Superboy impersonator, Superboy then wrapped up Walker in a lead tarp, where eventually the Kryptonite would be cleansed from Walker's body.

Kulak

Kulak is a sorcerer and supervillain in the DC Universe. The character was created by Jerry Siegel and Bernard Baily and first appeared in All Star Comics #2 (Fall 1940).

Within the context of the stories, Kulak is the high priest of the dead planet Brztal who had been imprisoned on Earth in antiquity. When released by archeologists in 1940, he seeks to destroy Earth, but is defeated by the Spectre.

The character was not used again until 1983, when he appears in a three-part story published in All-Star Squadron, and has rarely been used since.

Kyodai Ken
Kyodai Ken ((巨大剣) – literally "the huge sword" or "the gigantic sword") is a character appeared both in the DCAU and later in DC Comics. He is a ninja trained under Sensei, who also trained deadly martial artists like Bronze Tiger, Batman, and Lady Shiva, and was a temporary enemy of Batman.

First appearing in the Batman: The Animated Series episode "Night of the Ninja", Kyodai Ken was once the star pupil of Yoru, a top martial artist in Japan, but his morality left a lot to be desired. Kyodai found a less-than-worthy rival in the form of a foreigner named Bruce Wayne. A sparring session between Bruce and Kyodai ended with Kyodai the winner, who scoffed at Bruce's background. His boastfulness was put in check by Yoru, who proceeded to floor Kyodai with advanced moves, warning that there is always someone better and that a good martial artist is ethical and respectful to others. One night, Kyodai attempted to steal Yoru's prized sword, but was confronted by Bruce. Yoru halted the forthcoming fight, reclaimed the sword and expelled Kyodai from the dojo. Kyodai's pain was so great that he resettled in the city, somewhere in the Uramachi District. Kyodai contracted himself as the assassin for hire, the Ninja.

Years later, Kyodai traveled to Gotham City as the Ninja to exact revenge on Bruce. He began by committing several stings of corporate sabotage on seven Wayne Industries branches. While trying to break into Wayne Cosmetics, Batman intervened and when he displayed his stance, Kyodai realized Batman was Bruce Wayne. Batman also realized his identity as well, after a batarang from Robin cut the cloth on his back, revealing a menacing tattoo that Kyodai had during his training. He kidnapped Bruce and indirectly, Summer Gleeson after a Gotham Charities Reception. There, he revealed his plot: while he hated Bruce for getting him kicked out of the dojo, he also hated that he was born with a silver spoon in his mouth. The purpose for his robberies of Wayne Industries was to hack into the finances of the companies then transfer them to his bank account. Summer said the thefts made him a petty crook, but Kyodai mildly scoffed at that, saying by all the subterfuge he had committed it made him a clever thief. Bruce was able to escape after Robin had distracted Kyodai, but was unable to fight him as he would expose his alter ego to Gleeson. Fortunately, Robin restricted Gleeson's view, allowing Bruce to fight and overpower Kyodai. Instead of surrendering, Kyodai dove into a nearby river and escaped.

In his follow up episode Day of the Samurai", Kyodai returned to Japan and became intent on learning Yoru's ultimate technique, the 牙の方向 (Kiba no Houkou / Way of the Fang)'s 大眠り (o-nemuri/big sleep) touch, which was capable of killing a man in a single blow. He kidnapped Yoru's student Kairi and blackmailed her into giving him the location of the hidden scrolls containing the technique instructions. However, time had made the scrolls fragile and they fell apart upon contact, but Kyodai still managed to learn the touch from a recovered fragment. He kidnapped Alfred Pennyworth and lured Bruce to Mount Kajiiki for a final showdown, when Bruce discovered his hideout. Kyodai used the touch, but it failed, because Bruce wore a protective pad to defend the death point. When the volcano erupted, Kyodai was stranded on a melting rock. Bruce attempted to save him, but Kyodai, silently acknowledging him as a worthy opponent, bowed to him before another explosion of lava came between them and Kyodai had vanished. His fate is unrevealed, however, as he was not seen or heard from again, it is more than likely that he died. He was voiced by Robert Ito.

Comics
In Detective Comics #996, he appeared in a hallucination alongside his master Kirigi attacking a "giant bat".

References

 DC Comics characters: K, List of